Ilona Graenitz (15 March 1943 – 17 July 2022) was an Austrian politician who served in the National Council of Austria and the European Parliament as a member of the Social Democratic Party of Austria.

Biography 
Graenitz was born on 15 March 1943 in Vienna, then part of Nazi Germany. Her parents worked as clerks. Graenitz graduated from the University of World Trade in 1965 with a Dipl.-Kfm degree in business administration. In 1969, Graenitz received qualifications to become a language teacher. Graenitz later worked in banking and insurance. She also taught at Linz Polytechnic School from 1968 until 1972.

In 1979, Graenitz, a member of the Social Democratic Party of Austria (SPÖ), was elected to the Linz Municipal Council, serving until 1986, when she was elected to the National Council, the lower house of the Austrian Parliament. Graenitz, who represented Upper Austria, served in the National Council until 1995. She was also the secretary of the National Council from 1990 to 1995. From 1991 until 1994, Graenitz was part of the Austrian delegation to the Parliamentary Assembly of the Council of Europe. In 1995, Graenitz was elected to the European Parliament, representing the Austria constituency as a member of the Party of European Socialists. While in the European Parliament, she served as a rapporteur. Graenitz resigned from the European Parliament in 1999.

During her career, Graenitz also served as a party functionary, serving as the SPÖ director for the district of Linz and for the state of Upper Austria. In the 2010s, Graenitz served as the chair of various United Nations NGO committees, as part of the UN Conference of NGOs.

Graenitz died on 17 July 2022 at the age of 79 in Vienna.

Awards 

 Grand Decoration of Honour in Gold for Services to the Republic of Austria

References 

1943 births
2022 deaths
Politicians from Vienna
Politicians from Linz
Vienna University of Economics and Business alumni
20th-century Austrian politicians
MEPs for Austria 1996–1999
20th-century Austrian women politicians
20th-century women MEPs for Austria
Social Democratic Party of Austria politicians
Social Democratic Party of Austria MEPs
Members of the National Council (Austria)
Recipients of the Decoration of Honour for Services to the Republic of Austria